Iraiyanar (Tamil: இறையனார்), literally meaning "the Lord" and also a common name of Shiva, was a legendary poet of the Sangam period who is believed to have composed verse 2 of Kurunthogai. He is believed to be the incarnation of Lord Shiva of the temple at Madurai, known as 'Aalavaai Sokkar' or 'Sokkanathar'. Verse 3 of the Tiruvalluva Maalai, praising Valluvar, is also attributed to him.

Legend
Iraiyanar is said to be the human incarnation of Lord Somasundarar at the temple at Madurai. Iraiyanar appears in the Thiruvilaiyadal Puranam, where he confronts poet Nakkirar II. He is also said to have given the work Iraiyanar Akapporul. Some claim that Iraiyanar was a mortal poet who lived during the Sangam era.

Views on Valluvar and the Kural
Iraiyanar opines about Valluvar and the Kural text thus:

See also

 Iraiyanar Akapporul
 List of Sangam poets
 Sangam literature
 Tiruvalluva Maalai

Citations

References

 
 
 
 

Tamil philosophy
Tamil poets
Sangam poets
Legendary Indian people
Tiruvalluva Maalai contributors